Ruth Gay (née Slotkin; October 19, 1922 – May 9, 2006) was an American writer whose work concerned Jewish life. She won the 1997 National Jewish Book Award for non-fiction for Unfinished People: Eastern European Jews Encounter America (1996).

Early life and education
Ruth Slotkin was born to Harry Slotkin and Mary (Pfeffer) Slotkin on October 19, 1922, in New York City. Although she grew up in The Bronx, her family moved to Queens due to her father's job. As a result, she transferred to Queens College, where she was a member of the leftist student Zionist organization.

Slotkin earned a bachelor's degree from Queens College and a master's in library science from Columbia University in 1969.

Career
From 1948 to 1950 she was the editor of the JDC Review of the American Jewish Joint Distribution Committee.

In 1997, Gay received the National Jewish Book Award for nonfiction for her book "Unfinished People: Eastern European Jews Encounter America."

In 2002, she published "Safe Among the Germans: Liberated Jews After World War II" through the Yale University Press.

Personal life
Ruth Slotkin was first married to sociologist Nathan Glazer in 1942; during this 15-year marriage they had three daughters. She published extensively in Commentary and other publications during this period. They divorced in 1957.

Slotkin married historian Peter Gay in 1959.

Gay died in 2006 from leukemia.

Publications
 Safe among the Germans liberated Jews after World War II (New Haven, CT: Yale University Press, 2002)
 Unfinished People: Eastern European Jews Encounter America (New York, NY: W. W. Norton & Company, 1997)
 The Jews of Germany: A Historical Portrait (New Haven, CT: Yale University Press, 1992)

External links
 “Biographical Note.” Guide to the Ruth Gay Collection 1980s–1993, 2002. Processed by Yakov Illich Sklar.

References

Jewish women writers
Jewish American writers
1922 births
2006 deaths
Queens College, City University of New York alumni
Columbia University School of Library Service alumni
20th-century American Jews
21st-century American Jews
Jewish American non-fiction writers